is a former Japanese football player.

Club career
Spending most of his early career with regional league clubs in Japan, Fujimoto joins Hong Kong First Division League club Yuen Long District SA on a free transfer.

Club statistics
 As of 18 February 2014; Stats in Hong Kong only.

References

1986 births
Living people
Association football people from Saitama Prefecture
Japanese footballers
J2 League players
Thespakusatsu Gunma players
Fukushima United FC players
Hong Kong First Division League players
Yuen Long FC players
Association football midfielders
Guangzhou City F.C. non-playing staff